Khan Jahan Ali Thana is a Metropolitan Thana of Khulna Metropolitan Police in the Division of Khulna, Bangladesh.

Geography
It has 17373 households and total area 33.07 km2.

Demographics
As of the 1991 Bangladeshi census, Khan Jahan Ali has a population of 88659. Males constitute 55.39% of the population, and females 44.61%. This Upazila's eighteen up population is 49323. Khan Jahan Ali has an average literacy rate of 53% (7+ years), and the national average of 32.4% literate.

Administration
Khan Jahan Ali has 2 Unions/Wards, 26 Mauzas/Mahallas, and 1 village named Pariardanga.

See also
 Upazilas of Bangladesh
 Districts of Bangladesh
 Divisions of Bangladesh

References

Upazilas of Khulna District